Adamo Nagalo (born 22 September 2002) is an Ivorian footballer who plays as a centre-back for Danish Superliga club FC Nordsjælland.

Club career

FC Nordsjælland
Nagalo was born in Ivory Coast and was a part of the Right to Dream Academy in Ghana, before joining FC Nordsjælland in the summer 2020. Nagalo made three appearances for the clubs U-19 team, before he got his professional debut for the club against Lyngby in the Danish Superliga on 12 March 2021, replacing Daniel Svensson with three minutes left. 18-year old Nagalo made a total of six league appearances for Nordsjælland in the 2020–21 season.

Ahead of the 2021–22 season, Nagalo was permanently promoted to the first team squad.

International career
Born in the Ivory Coast, Nagalo is of Burkinabé descent. He was called up to the Burkina Faso national team for a set of friendlies in September 2022.

References

External links
 

2002 births
Living people
Ivorian footballers
Ivorian people of Burkinabé descent
Ivorian expatriate footballers
Right to Dream Academy players
FC Nordsjælland players
Danish Superliga players
Association football defenders
Ivorian expatriate sportspeople in Denmark
Expatriate men's footballers in Denmark
Expatriate footballers in Ghana